Elizabeth Stuart (19 August 159613 February 1662) was Electress of the Palatinate and briefly Queen of Bohemia as the wife of Frederick V of the Palatinate. Since her husband's reign in Bohemia lasted for just one winter, she is called the Winter Queen.

Elizabeth was the second child and eldest daughter of James VI and I, King of Scotland, England, and Ireland, and his wife, Anne of Denmark. With the demise of Anne, Queen of Great Britain, the last Stuart monarch in 1714, Elizabeth's grandson by her daughter Sophia of Hanover succeeded to the British throne as George I, initiating the House of Hanover.

Early life

Elizabeth was born at Dunfermline Palace, Fife, on 19 August 1596 at 2 o'clock in the morning. King James rode to the bedside from Callendar, where he was attending the wedding of the Earl of Orkney. At the time of her birth, her father was King of Scotland, but not yet King of England. Named in honour of Elizabeth I of England, her godmother, the young Elizabeth was christened on 28 November 1596 in the Chapel Royal at Holyroodhouse, and was then proclaimed by the heralds as "Lady Elizabeth". During her early life in Scotland, Elizabeth was brought up at Linlithgow Palace, where she was placed in the care of Lord Livingstone and his wife, Eleanor Hay. A couple of years later the king's second daughter, Margaret, was placed in their care as well. Elizabeth "did not pay particular attention to this younger sister", as even at this young age her affections were with her brother, Henry.

Move to England
When Queen Elizabeth I of England died in 1603, Elizabeth Stuart's father, James, succeeded as King of England and Ireland. The Countess of Kildare was appointed the princess's governess. Along with her elder brother, Henry, Elizabeth made the journey southward to England with her mother "in a triumphal progress of perpetual entertainment". On her father's birthday, 19 June, Elizabeth danced at Worksop Manor with Robert Cecil's son.

Elizabeth remained at court for a few weeks, but "there is no evidence that she was present at her parents' coronation" on 25 July 1603. It seems likely that by this time the royal children already had been removed to Oatlands, an old Tudor hunting lodge near Weybridge. There was plague in London, and Prince Henry and Princess Elizabeth were moved to Winchester. Anne of Denmark produced a masque to welcome them. On 19 October 1603 "an order was issued under the privy seal announcing that the King had thought fit to commit the keeping and education of the Lady Elizabeth to the Lord Harrington and his wife".

Under the care of Lord and Lady Harington at Coombe Abbey, Elizabeth met Anne Dudley, with whom she was to strike up a lifelong friendship. On 3 April 1604, Princess Elizabeth and her ladies rode from Coombe Abbey to Coventry. The Mayor and Aldermen met her at "Jabet's Ash on Stoke-green". She heard a sermon in St Michael's Church and dined in St Mary's Hall.

Gunpowder Plot

Part of the intent of the Gunpowder Plot of 1605 was to assassinate Elizabeth's father King James and the Protestant aristocracy, kidnap the nine-year-old Elizabeth from Coombe Abbey, and place her on the throne of England – and presumably the thrones of Ireland and Scotland – as a Catholic monarch. The conspirators chose Elizabeth after considering the other available options. Prince Henry, it was believed, would perish alongside his father. Charles was seen as too feeble (having only just learnt to walk) and Mary too young. Elizabeth, on the other hand, had already attended formal functions, and the conspirators knew that "she could fulfil a ceremonial role despite her comparative youth".

The conspirators aimed to cause an uprising in the Midlands to coincide with the explosion in London and at this point secure Elizabeth's accession as a puppet queen. She would then be brought up as a Catholic and later married to a Catholic bridegroom. The plot failed when the conspirators were betrayed, and Guy Fawkes was caught by the King's soldiers before he was able to ignite the powder.

Education

Elizabeth was given a comprehensive education for a princess at that time. This education included instruction in natural history, geography, theology, languages, writing, music, and dancing. She was denied instruction in the classics as her father believed that "Latin had the unfortunate effect of making women more cunning". By the age of 12, Elizabeth was fluent in several languages, including French, "which she spoke with ease and grace" and would later use to converse with her husband. She also was an excellent rider, had a thorough understanding of the Protestant religion, and had an aptitude for writing letters that "sounded sincere and never stilted". She also was extremely literary, and "several mementoes of her early love of books exist".

Courtship and marriage

Suitors
As the daughter of a reigning monarch, the hand of the young Elizabeth was seen as a very desirable prize. Suitors came from across the continent and were many and varied. They included:
 Gustavus Adolphus of Sweden, son (and later successor) of the King of Sweden
 Frederic Ulric, Duke of Brunswick-Wolfenbüttel
 Prince Maurice of Nassau
 Theophilus Howard, Lord Howard of Walden, later second Earl of Suffolk
 Otto, Hereditary Prince of Hesse-Kassel, son of Maurice, Landgrave of Hesse-Kassel
 Victor Amadeus, Prince of Piedmont, the King of Spain's nephew and heir to the Duke of Savoy
 Philip III of Spain, newly widowed in 1611.
Each suitor brought to the proposed marriage the prospect of power and greatness for the young Elizabeth.

Marriage would cost Elizabeth her father and her father's kingdom. When James had succeeded to the English throne in 1603, England had acquired a new role in European affairs. Unlike the childless Elizabeth I, James, by simply "having children, could play an important role in dynastic politics". The selection of Elizabeth's spouse, therefore, had little to do with her personal preference and a great deal to do with the benefits the match could bring.

Most of her suitors were rejected quickly for a variety of reasons. Some simply were not of high enough birth, had no real prospects to offer, or in the case of Gustavus Adolphus, who on all other grounds seemed like a perfect match, because "his country was at war with Queen Anne's native Denmark". Furthermore, England could not face another religious revolution, and therefore the religious pre-requisite was paramount.

The man chosen was Frederick (Friedrich) V, Count Palatine of the Rhine. Frederick was of undeniably high lineage. His ancestors included the kings of Aragon and Sicily, the landgraves of Hesse, the dukes of Brabant and Saxony, and the counts of Nassau and Leuven. He and Elizabeth also shared a common ancestor in Henry II of England. He was "a senior Prince of the Empire" and a staunch defender of the Protestant faith.

Courtship
Frederick arrived in England on 16 October 1612, and the match seemed to please them both from the beginning. Their contemporaries noted how Frederick seemed to "delight in nothing but her company and conversation". Frederick also struck up a friendship with Elizabeth's elder brother, Prince Henry, which delighted his prospective bride immensely. King James did not take into consideration the couple's happiness, but saw the match as "one step in a larger process of achieving domestic and European concord". The only person seemingly unhappy with the match was Queen Anne. As the daughter of a king, the sister of a king, the wife of a king, and the mother of a future king, she also desired to be the mother of a queen. She is said to have been somewhat fond of Frederick's mild manner and generous nature but simply felt that he was of low stock.

On 6 November 1612 Henry, Prince of Wales, died. His death took an emotional toll on Elizabeth, and her new position as second in line to the throne made her an even more desirable match. Queen Anne and those like-minded who had "always considered the Palsgrave to be an unworthy match for her, were emboldened in their opposition". Elizabeth stood by Frederick, whom her brother had approved, and whom she found to have the sentiments of a fine gentleman. Above all, he was "regarded as the future head of the Protestant interest in Germany".

Marriage to Frederick V

The wedding took place on 14 February 1613 at the royal chapel at the Palace of Whitehall and was a grand occasion that saw more royalty than ever visit the court of England. The marriage was an enormously popular match and was the occasion for an outpouring of public affection with the ceremony described as "a wonder of ceremonial and magnificence even for that extravagant age".

It was celebrated with lavish and sophisticated festivities both in London and Heidelberg, including mass feasts and lavish furnishings that cost nearly £50,000, and nearly bankrupted King James. Among many celebratory writings of the events was John Donne's "Epithalamion, Or Marriage Song on the Lady Elizabeth, and Count Palatine being married on St Valentine's Day". A contemporary author viewed the whole marriage as a prestigious event that saw England "lend her rarest gem, to enrich the Rhine".

Electress Palatine
After almost a two-month stay in London for continued celebrations, the couple began their journey to join the Electoral court in Heidelberg. The journey was filled with meeting people, sampling foods and wines, and being entertained by a wide variety of performers and companies. At each place the young couple stopped, Elizabeth was expected to distribute presents. The cash to allow her to do so was not readily available, so she had to use one of her own jewels as collateral so that the goldsmith Abraham Harderet would "provide her with suitable presents on credit".

Her arrival in Heidelberg was seen as "the crowning achievement of a policy which tried to give the Palatinate a central place in international politics" and was long anticipated and welcomed. Elizabeth's new husband transformed his seat at Heidelberg Castle, creating between 1610 and 1613 the Englischer Bau (i.e., English Building) for her, a monkey-house, a menagerie, and the beginnings of a new garden in the Italian Renaissance garden style popular in England at the time. The garden, the Hortus Palatinus, was constructed by Elizabeth's former tutor, Salomon de Caus. It was dubbed the "Eighth Wonder of the World" by contemporaries.

Although Elizabeth and Frederick were considered to be genuinely in love and remained a romantic couple throughout the course of their marriage, problems already had begun to arise. Before the couple had left England, King James had made Frederick promise that Elizabeth "would take precedence over his mother ... and always be treated as if she were a Queen". This at times made life in the Palatinate uncomfortable for Elizabeth, as Frederick's mother Louise Juliana had "not expected to be demoted in favour of her young daughter-in-law" and, as such, their relationship was never more than cordial.

Elizabeth gave birth to three children in Heidelberg: Frederick Henry, Hereditary Prince of the Palatinate (sometimes called Henry Frederick) was born in 1614, Charles in 1617, and Elisabeth in 1619.

Queen of Bohemia
In 1619 Elizabeth's husband Frederick was one of those offered the throne of Bohemia.

The Kingdom of Bohemia was "an aristocratic republic in all but name", whose nobles elected the monarch. It was one of the few successful pluralist states. The country had enjoyed a long period of religious freedom, but in March 1619, on the death of Emperor Matthias, this seemed about to change. The Habsburg heir, Archduke Ferdinand, crowned King of Bohemia in 1617, was a fervent Catholic who brutally persecuted Protestants in his Duchy of Styria. The Bohemian nobles had to choose between "either accepting Ferdinand as their king after all or taking the ultimate step of deposing him". They decided on deposition, and, when others declined because of the risks involved, the Bohemians "pandered to the elector's royalist pretensions" and extended the invitation to Elizabeth's husband.

Frederick, although doubtful, was persuaded to accept. Elizabeth "appealed to his honour as a prince and a cavalier, and to his humanity as a Christian", aligning herself with him completely. The family moved to Prague, where "the new King was received with genuine joy". Frederick was crowned officially in the St. Vitus Cathedral at the Prague Castle on 4 November 1619. The coronation of Elizabeth as Queen of Bohemia followed three days later.

The royal couple's third son, Prince Rupert, was born in Prague one month after the coronation. There was great popular rejoicing. Thus, Frederick's reign in Bohemia had begun well, but only lasted one year. The Bohemian crown "had always been a corner-stone of Habsburg policy" and the heir, Ferdinand, now Holy Roman Emperor Ferdinand II, would not yield. Frederick's reign ended with the defeat of Bohemian Protestant armies at the Battle of White Mountain (which ended the first phase of the Thirty Years' War) on 8 November 1620.

Elizabeth is remembered as the "Winter Queen", and Frederick as the "Winter King", in reference to the brevity of their reign, and to the season of the battle.

Exile

It was there on 6 January 1621 that she "in an easy labour lasting little more than an hour" was delivered of a healthy son, Maurice.

The military defeat removed the prospect of returning to Prague, and the entire family was forced to flee. They could no longer return to the Palatinate as it was occupied by the Catholic league and a Spanish contingent. So, after an invitation from the Prince of Orange, they moved to The Hague.

Elizabeth arrived in The Hague in spring 1621 with only a small court. Elizabeth's sense of duty to assist her husband out of the political mess in which they had found themselves meant that "she became much more an equal, if not the stronger, partner in the marriage". Her lady-in-waiting, Amalia van Solms, soon became involved with Frederick Henry, Prince of Orange and married him in 1625. The two women became rivals at the court of The Hague.

While in exile Elizabeth produced eight more children, four boys and four girls. The last, Gustavus, was born on 2 January 1632 and baptised in the Cloister Church where two of his siblings who had died young, Louis and Charlotte, were buried. Later that same month, Frederick said farewell to Elizabeth and set out on a journey to join the king of Sweden on the battlefield. After declining conditions set out by King Gustavus Adolphus that would have seen the Swedish king assist in his restoration, the pair parted with Frederick heading back toward The Hague. He had been ill with an infection since the beginning of October 1632, and died on the morning of 29 November before reaching The Hague.

Widowhood
When Elizabeth received the news of Frederick's death, she became senseless with grief and for three days did not eat, drink, or sleep. When Charles I heard of Elizabeth's state, he invited her to return to England, but she refused. The rights of her son and Frederick's heir Charles Louis "remained to be fought for". Elizabeth then fought for her son's rights, but she remained in The Hague even after he regained the Electorate of the Palatinate in 1648. She became a patron of the arts, and commissioned a larger family portrait to honour herself and her husband, to complement the impressive large seascape of her 1613 joyous entry to the Netherlands. Her memorial family portrait of 1636 was outdone by Amalia van Solms, who commissioned the Oranjezaal after the death of her husband Frederick Henry in 1648–1651.

Elizabeth filled her time with copious letter writing and making marriage matches for her children. Between Frederick's death in 1632 and her own 30 years later, she witnessed the deaths of four more of her ten surviving children: Gustavus in 1641, Philip in 1650, Henriette Marie in 1651, and Maurice in 1652. Her brother Charles I, King of England was executed in early 1649, and the surviving Stuart family was exiled during the years of the Commonwealth. The relationships with her remaining living children also became somewhat estranged, although she did spend time with her growing number of grandchildren. She began to pay the price for having been "a distant mother to most of her own children", and the idea of going to England now was uppermost in her thoughts.

Death
In 1660, the Stuarts were restored to the thrones of England, Scotland and Ireland in the person of Elizabeth's nephew Charles II. Elizabeth arrived in England on 26 May 1661. By July, she was no longer planning on returning to The Hague and made plans for the remainder of her furniture, clothing, and other property to be sent to her. She then proceeded to move to Drury House, where she established a small, but impressive and welcoming, household. On 29 January 1662 she made another move, to Leicester House, Westminster, but by this time she was quite ill. Elizabeth caught pneumonia, bled from her lungs on 10 February 1662 and died soon after midnight on 13 February.

Her death caused little public stir as by then her "chief, if not only, claim to fame was as the mother of Rupert of the Rhine, the legendary Cavalier general". On the evening of 17 February, when her coffin (into which her remains had been placed the previous day) left Somerset House, Rupert was the only one of her sons to follow the funeral procession to Westminster Abbey. There in the chapel of Henry VII, "a survivor of an earlier age, isolated and without a country she could really call her own", she was laid to rest among her ancestors and close to her beloved elder brother, Henry, Prince of Wales.

Issue
Elizabeth and Frederick had 13 children, six of whom outlived their mother:

 Henry Frederick, Hereditary Prince of the Palatinate (1614–1629); drowned
 Charles I Louis, Elector Palatine (1617–1680); married Charlotte of Hesse-Kassel, had issue including Elizabeth Charlotte, Princess Palatine, Duchess of Orleans; married Marie Luise von Degenfeld, had issue; married again Elisabeth Holländer von Berau (1659-1702), had issue
 Elisabeth of the Palatinate (1618–1680)
 Rupert, Count Palatine of the Rhine (1619–1682); had two illegitimate children
 Maurice of the Palatinate (16 January 1621 – 1 September 1652)
 Louise Hollandine of the Palatinate (18 April 162211 February 1709)
 Louis (21 August 162424 December 1624)
 Edward, Count Palatine of Simmern (1625–1663); married Anne Gonzaga, had issue
 Henriette Marie of the Palatinate (7 July 162618 September 1651); married Prince Sigismund Rákóczi, brother of George II Rákóczi, Prince of Transylvania, on 16 June 1651
 John Philip Frederick of the Palatinate (26 September 162716 February 1650); also reported to have been born on 15 September 1629 
 Charlotte of the Palatinate (19 December 162814 January 1631)
 Sophia, Electress of Hanover (14 October 16308 June 1714); married Ernest Augustus, Elector of Hanover, had issue, including King George I of Great Britain. Many other royal families are Sophia's, and therefore, Elizabeth's, descendants. Sophia came close to ascending to the British throne, but died two months before Queen Anne.
 Gustavus Adolphus of the Palatinate (14 January 16321641)

Ancestry

Legacy
Under the English Act of Settlement 1701, the succession to the English and Scottish crowns (later British crown) was settled on Elizabeth's youngest daughter Sophia of Hanover and her issue. In August 1714, Sophia's son (Elizabeth's grandson) George I ascended to the throne, with the future Royal family all his descendants and hence, also descendants of Elizabeth.

The Elizabeth River in colonial Southeastern Virginia was named in honour of the princess, as was Cape Elizabeth, a peninsula, and today a town in the United States in the state of Maine. John Smith explored and mapped New England and gave names to places mainly based on the names used by Native Americans. When Smith presented his map to Charles I, he suggested that the king should feel free to change the "barbarous names" for "English" ones. The king made many such changes, but only four survive today, one of which is Cape Elizabeth.

According to legend, William Craven, 1st Earl of Craven, built Ashdown House in Berkshire, England, in honour of Elizabeth, although she died before the house was completed.

Literary references
The Polish baroque poet Daniel Naborowski wrote a short poem praising Elizabeth's eyes. He had seen her in 1609, when he visited London on a diplomatic mission.
 A poem in praise of Elizabeth was written by the courtier and poet Sir Henry Wotton
The Winter Queen plays a seminal role in Neal Stephenson's The Baroque Cycle which is largely set during her lifetime.
 Elizabeth is a main character in Daniel Kehlmann's novel Tyll (2017).

See also
 Scotland and the Thirty Years' War

Bibliography

 

 Kassel, Richard (2006), The Organ: An Encyclopedia, London: Routledge.
 

 Spencer, Charles (2008) Prince Rupert: the Last Cavalier, London: Phoenix.
  (alternative )

 , devotes its early chapters to describing her 1613 wedding and the reputation she and her husband had in Europe at the time.

References

External links

 Royal weddings in history: a Stuart Valentine, Elizabeth and Frederick, National Archives

|-

|-

1596 births
1662 deaths
16th-century Scottish people
17th-century Scottish people
16th-century Scottish women
17th-century Scottish women
17th-century English women
Heirs to the Scottish throne
Heirs to the English throne
Scottish princesses
English princesses
Bohemian queens consort
Electresses of the Palatinate
House of Stuart
German people of the Thirty Years' War
1596 in Scotland
People from Dunfermline
Scottish people of Danish descent
Scottish people of German descent
English people of German descent
Scottish people of French descent
Scottish people of Polish descent
Burials at Westminster Abbey
Children of James VI and I
Daughters of kings